Lord Bojong (보종공) (CE 580 – CE 621) was a member of Silla's royal family, Hwarang and also the 16th Pungwolju or Gukseon (國仙) from CE 616 to CE 621.

Biography

Bojong was born in CE 580 at Seorabeol, capital city of Silla Kingdom in the reign of King Jinheung. Bojong was the only son of Lord Seolwon and Lady Mishil. He was talented in martial arts. Then he became Hwarang at 15 years old and served his mother, Lady Mishil. He became Gukseon, the Hwarang Leader, in CE 616 replacing Kim Yushin.

Popular culture
 Portrayed by Baek Do-bin and Kwak Jung-wook in the 2009 MBC TV series Queen Seondeok.

Family
Parents
Father:  Seolwon Rang (설원랑, 549–606
Mother: Lady Mishil (미실; c. 546/548 – c. 612)
Consorts and issue
Princess Yang-myeong, of the Kim clan ( 양명공주 김씨)
Princess Bora (보라궁주) 
Princess Boryang (보량궁주; 604 – 670)
Daughter of Munno (문노), the 8th Pungwolju

References

Samguk Yusa: Legends and History of the Three Kingdoms of Ancient Korea, translated by Tae-Hung Ha and Grafton K. Mintz. Yonsei University Press: Seoul, Korea. 
Silla people